Michael James Hesson  (born 30 October 1974) is a New Zealand cricket coach and former head coach of the New Zealand cricket team. He also coached Argentina and Kenya, and Otago in NZ domestic cricket. He was appointed head coach of New Zealand on 20 July 2012, taking over from John Wright in August for their tour of India, and later extensions to his contract would have taken him through to the end of 2019 Cricket World Cup, but Hesson announced his resignation on 7 June 2018, ending his tenure as one of the most successful coaches in the history of the national side.

Prior to his appointment by New Zealand, he had served as Kenya's coach, citing "security concerns" as the reason for his resignation.

Hesson was criticised for his controversial recommendation that Ross Taylor should surrender the captaincy in favour of Brendon McCullum  However, in 2013–14, Hesson mended the relationship with Taylor and took the BlackCaps to series wins in England and South Africa away, and West Indies and India at home. He also proved his talent for picking players who could translate domestic success into international success. This built momentum for the BlackCaps' revival, culminating in reaching the final of the Cricket World Cup 2015.

The BlackCaps' culture and style of play cultivated by Hesson and McCullum was transformative for cricket in New Zealand. In the 2015 Queen's Birthday Honours Hesson and McCullum were appointed Officers of the New Zealand Order of Merit for services to cricket.

In the 2017/2018 New Zealand summer the BlackCaps were inundated with plaudits as they achieved a New Zealand-record 13-match winning streak in completed games across all formats. From August 2012 to April 2018, when his reign culminated in a Test series win at home against England, Hesson's team played 53 Tests, won 21, lost 19 and drawn 13. By comparison, the 1980s had 59 Tests of which 17 were won, 15 lost and 27 drawn. In completed ODIs, Hesson oversaw 112 for 65 wins, 46 losses and a tie; the 1980s results were 122 played, 56 won and 66 lost.  In Twenty20 internationals (not played in the 1980s), the figures were 56 completed games, with 30 wins, 24 losses and two ties.

Hesson was New Zealand's longest serving cricket coach. He developed a reputation for being a paragon of calm and a brilliant man-manager, and for developing and maintaining an admirable team culture, all the while taking the BlackCaps to unprecedented success. In May 2018 Hesson was appointed as a coach representative on the International Cricket Council Cricket Committee.

Despite his contract running until the end of 2019 Cricket World Cup, Hesson announced his resignation in June 2018.
On January 3, 2019, Hesson joined the Sky Sports commentary team for the home white ball series.

Hesson also served as the head coach of IPL franchise Kings XI Punjab before stepping down on 8 August 2019. Subsequently, on 23 August 2019, he was appointed as the Director of Cricket Operations by the IPL franchise Royal Challengers Bangalore.

References

External links
 

1974 births
Living people
New Zealand cricket coaches
Coaches of the Kenya national cricket team
Cricketers from Dunedin
Coaches of the New Zealand national cricket team
Officers of the New Zealand Order of Merit